Glen Nami is a Papua New Guinean rugby league coach and former player for the Goroka Lahanis. He played for the Kumuls in the 2010 Four Nations and scored a try against New Zealand. He joined Whitehaven in 2012.

References

External links
Team Profiles at RLFourNations.com

Papua New Guinean rugby league players
Papua New Guinean sportsmen
Living people
Papua New Guinea national rugby league team players
Rugby league five-eighths
Goroka Lahanis players
Whitehaven R.L.F.C. players
Papua New Guinean expatriate rugby league players
Expatriate rugby league players in England
Papua New Guinean expatriate sportspeople in England
Year of birth missing (living people)